William Allen (December 18 or 27, 1803 – July 11, 1879) was a Democratic Representative, Senator and 31st governor of Ohio.

Early life and family
Allen was born in Edenton, North Carolina and moved to Chillicothe, Ohio in 1819, after his parents' death. He was of Quaker ancestry.

Allen and his sister Mary Granberry Allen lived in Chillicothe together. His sister married Reverend Pleasant Thurman, and their son, Allen G. Thurman, followed in his uncle's footsteps, becoming a lawyer and politician.

Allen attended Chillicothe Academy before studying law with Colonel Edward King. He was admitted to the bar in Ohio at age 21. He began his career as a politician in the Democratic Party at a young age.

Career

Allen served as United States Representative from Ohio from 1833 to 1835, losing his bid for re-election. He served as United States Senator from Ohio from 1837 to 1849, losing a bid for a third term in 1848.

While in the Senate, Allen was one of a group of Western Democrat expansionists who asserted that the U.S. had a valid claim to the entire Oregon Country, which was an issue during the 1844 U.S. presidential election.  He suggested that the United States should be prepared to go to war with the United Kingdom to annex the entire Oregon Country up to Russian-owned Alaska at latitude 54°40′N.  This position ultimately produced the slogan "Fifty-Four Forty or Fight!," coined in 1846 by opponents of such a policy (not, as popularly believed, a slogan in the 1844 Presidential campaign). Allen supported "popular sovereignty" and the presidential candidacy of fellow-Democrat Lewis Cass in 1848.

In 1849, Allen retired to his farm, "Fruit Hill", which had belonged to his father-in-law, and fellow Ohio Governor, Duncan McArthur, near Chillicothe, Ohio. Allen identified himself as a "Peace Democrat" by opposing the American Civil War. Allen did not return to public service for nearly a quarter century until he served as Governor of Ohio from 1874 to 1876. He unsuccessfully sought a second two-year term in an 1875 election.

Allen was noted for his loud voice. A friend asked Senator Benjamin Tappan if a fellow Ohioan was still in Washington. Tappan replied, "No, he left yesterday and is probably by this time in Cumberland, Maryland, but if you will go to Bill Allen and tell him to raise that window and call him, he will come back."

Death
At the close of his administration, he retired to private life at Fruit Hill, where he died in 1879. Allen is buried at Grandview Cemetery, Chillicothe.

Legacy
Allen County, Kansas is named for William Allen.

In 1887, Ohio donated a statue of Allen to the National Statuary Hall Collection, which was exhibited in the National Statuary Hall of the U.S. Capitol. The statue was sculpted by Charles H. Niehaus.  In 2010, the Ohio Historical Society held a statewide poll on the suitability of Allen as a distinguished representative of the state. The poll found that many Ohioans objected to Allen. On August 26, the Ohio National Statuary Committee voted to replace Allen's statue with a statue of Ohio-born inventor Thomas Edison. The Ohio General Assembly agreed to replace the statue in part because "Allen’s pro-slavery position and outspoken criticism of President Abraham Lincoln during the Civil War make him a poor representative for Ohio in the U.S. Capitol." However, lack of funding for the Edison statue delayed replacement of the Allen statue. The Edison statue was completed in spring 2015, and was installed on September 20, 2016. The statue of Allen was relocated to the Ross County Heritage Center in Chillicothe.

References

External links

 National Statuary Hall Collection: William Allen at Architect of the Capitol
 
 
 

1803 births
1879 deaths
Burials at Grandview Cemetery (Chillicothe, Ohio)
Democratic Party governors of Ohio
Politicians from Chillicothe, Ohio
People of Ohio in the American Civil War
Democratic Party members of the United States House of Representatives from Ohio
Democratic Party United States senators from Ohio
Jacksonian members of the United States House of Representatives from Ohio
19th-century American politicians
People from Edenton, North Carolina
Chairmen of the Senate Committee on Foreign Relations
Copperheads (politics)